Kill the chicken to scare the monkey (lit. kill chicken scare monkey) is an old Chinese idiom. It refers to making an example out of someone in order to threaten others.

According to an old folktale, a street entertainer earned a lot of money with his dancing monkey. One day, when the monkey refused to dance, the entertainer killed a live chicken in front of the monkey and then the monkey resumed dancing.

A historical anecdote relates that, at the beginning of the Zhou Dynasty, Jiāng Zǐyá was asked by his king to find him an adviser. Jiāng Zǐyá asked a scholar who lived on a mountaintop. When the scholar refused multiple times, Jiāng Zǐyá killed the scholar knowing that the next scholar he asked to join the kingdom would fear the same fate, and thereby would accept the invitation.

See also 
 "Killing the Chickens, to Scare the Monkeys", a 2011 short film
 Dans ce pays-ci, il est bon de tuer de temps en temps un amiral pour encourager les autres – "In this country, it is thought wise to kill an admiral from time to time to encourage the others.", an expression used in Voltaire's novel Candide referring to the admiral Byng's execution at the Battle of Minorca (1756)

References 

Chinese-language idioms